The Hororata River is a river of Canterbury, in the South Island of New Zealand.

See also
List of rivers of New Zealand

References

Rivers of Canterbury, New Zealand
Rivers of New Zealand